Line 25 of the Shenzhen Metro is a line under planning, which will connect across Shenzhen through the districts of Luohu, Longhua, Longgang and Bao'an for 38.5 kilometers and 30 stations. Construction is planned to begin in 2023. The first phase of Line 25 has entered Phase V planning, and will run from Jihua Hospital in Longgang District to Shilong in Bao'an District, with 14 stations and 16.2 kilometers of track. The line is proposed to use 6 car type B trains.

Stations (Phase 1)

References

Shenzhen Metro lines
Transport infrastructure under construction in China